The 2020–21 Martinique Championnat National was the 101st season of the Martinique Championnat National, the top division football competition in Martinique. The season began on 4 September 2020 and ended on 16 March 2021.

The season was split into two regional groups due to the COVID-19 pandemic in Martinique. The top three teams in each group are to play in a Championship Round, and the bottom five teams in each group are to play in the relegation round, but no matches have been reported of as of July 2021.

Clubs 
 Aiglon
 Assaut
 Colonial
 Essor-Préchotain
 Franciscain
 Golden Lion
 Golden Star
 Lorrian
 Monnerot
 New Star
 Olympique
 Rivière-Pilote
 Robert
 Saint-Joseph
 Samaritaine
 Trénelle

Regular season

Group A

Group B

Championship round 
To be determined

References

External links
Ligue de football de la Martinique
Championnat National at Soccerway

Martinique Championnat National
Martinique
2020–21 in Martiniquan football